The Palais des Sports de Libreville is a multisports use arena situated in Libreville, Gabon. The arena was built to host the 2018 African Men's Handball Championship and all of the tournament's games were held there. Nevertheless, the arena can be used to hold games of handball, volleyball, basketball and other team or individual sports.

References

Buildings and structures in Libreville
Indoor arenas in Gabon
Sport in Libreville